Jamwon Station is a station on the Seoul Subway Line 3. It is located in Jamwon-dong, Seocho-gu, Seoul.

Surrounding 
There are Kyungwon Junior High School, Banpo General Social Welfare Center, Banpo 3 Resident Center, Hangang Citizen Park Jamwon District, Shindong Elementary School, Shindong Middle School, Jamwon Security Center and Jamwon-dong Residents Center.

Station layout

Entrance
 Exit 1 : Hanshin APT
 Exit 2 : Gyeongwon Middle School
 Exit 3 : Hangang Citizens's Park of Jamwon
 Exit 4 : Sindong Elementary & Middle Schools

Passengers

References 

Seoul Metropolitan Subway stations
Railway stations in South Korea opened in 1985
Metro stations in Seocho District
Seoul Subway Line 3